Peter Stein (born 1 October 1937) is a German theatre and opera director who established himself at the Schaubühne am Lehniner Platz, a company that he brought to the forefront of German theatre.

Biography
Born in Berlin, Stein grew up in an era defined by the Nazis. His father, Herbert Stein, was factory director of Alfred Teves, a motorcycle manufacturing firm that the Nazi regime employed to make automotive parts. Herbert was in charge of 250,000 forced laborers. He was also involved in the Confessing Church, a resistance group.

Stein has said that these events had a profound effect on his life. After the war, his father was sentenced to two years of forced labor for collaborating with the Nazis. Stein's academic performance nosedived and he barely made it into Frankfurt University. He then moved to Munich and enrolled at university there, pursuing a PhD thesis on the works of E. T. A. Hoffmann.

Having been curious about the theatre since his time in Frankfurt, he became a stagehand in Munich and eventually earned other parts. Proving himself, he was hired as director for Saved by Edward Bond. This piece threw him into the limelight and was critically acclaimed. Politically driven, Stein went on to direct many politically charged pieces, including Vietnam-Discourse by Peter Weiss, Bond's Early Morning, Seán O'Casey's Cock-a-Doodle Dandy, The Changeling by Thomas Middleton, and William Rowley and Goethe's Torquato Tasso.

He joined it in 1970 and soon became its director, running it as an egalitarian socialist democracy. The success of his productions at the small theatre enabled him to move to a new space in 1981, which was built according to his wishes inside the Schaubühne am Lehniner Platz. After the end of his relationship with partner Jutta Lampe in 1985, Stein left the Schaubühne.

Stein has also directed operas, such as Rheingold in Paris, 1976 (conducted by Georg Solti); Otello for the Welsh National Opera in 1987; and Moses und Aron for the Salzburg Festival, 1996 (conducted by Pierre Boulez). In 2011, he directed a new production of Verdi's Macbeth for the Salzburg Festival, with Riccardo Muti conducting, and in 2013 he directed Verdi's Don Carlos in Salzburg. In 2019, Stein directed a production of Le Misanthrope with Lambert Wilson at the  theatre in Paris.

He is married to Italian actress Maddalena Crippa.

Europe Theatre Prize
In 2011, Stein was the recipient of the Europe Theatre Prize, in Saint Petersburg. The prize organization stated:The award of the 14th Europe Theatre Prize to Peter Stein, the creator of monumental productions often staged in unusual spaces, celebrates the career of one of the most important figures of German and European theatre in the second half of the 20th century.

Since the end of the 1960s, Peter Stein, leader and “demiurge” of an extraordinary collective, has succeeded in regenerating theatre in Germany and Germanic areas. He has enriched it with his interest in exploratory work on the actor and the scenic space, the text and timing, which – following a German and central European tradition – manifest in a provocative expression of politics, philology, collective artistic creation, revelations of history and a re-examination of the critical and social function of theatre in today’s world. The experience of “his” collective, beginning in 1970 at the Schaubühne in Berlin with Bruno Ganz, Edith Clever, Jutta Lampe, Michael König and other actors, redefined the meaning of theatre work in terms that quite soon were recognisable as Steinian. Alternating reinterpretations of Ibsen, von Kleist, Brecht, Gorky, Shakespeare, Aeschylus and Chekhov with productions of Edward Bond, Peter Handke and Botho Strauss, the work evolved constantly, with a framework, method and choices through which Stein directed his actors and collaborators along a shared, highly engrossing path, at once artistic and political, that marked a particular period of the Berlin and European scene. Since then, Peter Stein has continued to take on an impressive range of material, from myth, classics, and opera to contemporary drama and film. His rigorous, relentless work, his determined explorations undaunted by geographic or linguistic barriers, continues to provide European theatre with reinterpretations and works of such remarkable intensity and meaning that we are forced to recognise theatre as an active, living body, with a distinct role in our era. Peter Stein’s vitality, vast cultural knowledge and passion for every aspect of theatre work have driven him in recent years towards new creations and activities. He has staged a number of operas, particularly from the Russian repertoire, and in Russia presented a memorable adaptation of the Oresteia. He also has two recent publications: the well-received essay My Chekhov and Essayer encore, échouer toujours, a book in which he discusses his work in an interview with Georges Banu. For some years now, Stein has been living in Italy, following his marriage to actress Maddalena Crippa. There, among his other European and Italian activities, he has created and even personally handled the production aspects of a Faust Fantasia by Goethe and a theatrical reinterpretation of The Demons by Dostoyevsky, a play which was instantly acclaimed as the greatest theatrical event of recent times. Peter Stein’s wide-ranging mastery and spirit of tireless exploration, as evidenced by these accomplishments, continue to offer new perspectives, teachings and inspiration to theatre around the world.

Major productions
Productions without a specified location were at the Schaubühne Berlin.
 1967 – Gerettet by Edward Bond (West German premiere), adapted by Martin Sperr, at the Werkraumtheater of the Munich Kammerspiele.
 1968 – In the Jungle of Cities by Bertolt Brecht at the Werkraumtheater of the Munich Kammerspiele, with Hans Korte as Shlink, Bruno Ganz as Garga, Edith Clever as Marie, and Dieter Laser as Wurm.
 1969 – Torquato Tasso by Johann Wolfgang von Goethe
 Early Morning by Edward Bond
 1970 – The Changeling by Thomas Middleton and William Rowley
 The Mother by Bertolt Brecht
 1971 – Die Auseinandersetzung by 
 Peer Gynt by Henrik Ibsen
 1972 – Optimistic Tragedy by Vsevolod Vishnevsky
  by Marieluise Fleißer
 Prinz Friedrich von Homburg by Heinrich von Kleist
 1973 – The Piggy Bank (Das Sparschwein) by Eugène Labiche
 1974 – Antikenprojekt I – 1. Abend: Übungen für Schauspieler
 Die Unvernünftigen sterben aus by Peter Handke
 Sommergäste by Maxim Gorky
 1976 – Shakespeare's memory – 2 evenings
 1977 – As You Like It by William Shakespeare
 1978 – Trilogie des Wiedersehens by Botho Strauß
 Big and Little (Groß und klein) by Botho Strauß, world premiere with Edith Clever as Lotte
 1980 – Antikenprojekt II: Oresteia by Aeschylus
 1981 – Klassenfeind by Nigel Williams, German premiere
 Nicht Fisch nicht Fleisch by Franz Xaver Kroetz
 1982 – Der Streit / Die Aufrichtigen by Pierre Carlet de Chamblain de Marivaux
 1983 – Die Neger by Jean Genet
 1984 – Drei Schwestern by Anton Chekhov
 Der Park by Botho Strauß
 1986 – The Hairy Ape (Der haarige Affe) by Eugene O'Neill
 Phädra by Jean Racine
 1989 – Der Kirschgarten by Anton Chekhov
 1990 – Roberto Zucco by Bernard-Marie Koltès, world premiere.
 1992 – Julius Caesar by William Shakespeare
 Pelléas et Mélisande by Debussy; Welsh National Opera 1992; conductor Pierre Boulez
 1994 – Antony and Cleopatra by William Shakespeare
 1998 – Hamlet by William Shakespeare
 2000 – Faust I & II by Johann Wolfgang von Goethe
 Simon Boccanegra by Giuseppe Verdi (at the Salzburg Easter Festival)
 2003 – Die Möve by Anton Chekhov
 2005 – Blackbird by David Harrower
 Medea by Euripides
 2006 – Troilus and Cressida (Shakespeare) and Mazeppa (Tchaikovsky/Burenin)
 2007 – Electra by Sophocles
 2010 – Oedipus at Colonus by Sophocles; Salzburg Festival; with Klaus Maria Brandauer as Oedipus
 2011 – Macbeth by Verdi; Salzburg Festival; conductor Riccardo Muti
 2010 – Don Carlos by Verdi; Salzburg Festival; conductor Antonio Pappano
 2013 –  by Eugène Labiche, Odéon-Théâtre de l'Europe, Paris

References
Notes

Sources
 Patterson, Michael. 1981. Peter Stein: Germany's Leading Theatre Director. Directors in Perspective ser. Cambridge: Cambridge UP. .

External links

1937 births
German theatre directors
German opera directors
Living people
Knights Commander of the Order of Merit of the Federal Republic of Germany
Recipients of the Pour le Mérite (civil class)